Tondapally is a village and panchayat in Vikarabad district, Ts, India. It falls under Parigi mandal.

Education
Tondapally panchayath has improved literacy ratings compared to surrounding areas. This is attributed to the high levels connectivity to neighbouring major towns like Shadnagar and Pargi which have colleges and International Schools. Tondapally outputs a relatively high number of graduates who works in Capgemini, Infosys, Amazon (company), Kärcher etc...

Agriculture
In Tondapally Panchayath, agriculture is the primary source of income and the region commonly grows Cotton, Corn, Wheat, Dal and Paddy. The region is locally known for its milk production as well.

Connectivity
Tondapally is on the state highway which connects Telangana and Gulbarga, Karnataka. It is located 23 km from NH 7 which connects Hyderabad and Bangalore and it takes about an hour driving to reach Rajiv Gandhi International Airport.

References

Villages in Vikarabad district